Miguel Guilherme (born 15 November 1958) is a Portuguese actor. He appeared in more than seventy films since 1980.

Selected filmography

References

External links
 

1958 births
Living people
People from Lisbon
Portuguese male film actors
20th-century Portuguese male actors
21st-century Portuguese male actors